The FreeSharing Network was an international free recycling network that redistributes unwanted usable items by making them available free via a network of locally managed internet mailing lists.

FreeSharing.org was created on February 8, 2005 as an alternative to the existing The Freecycle Network.
At the time several existing Freecycle groups expressed displeasure with the sponsorship of Freecycle by Waste Management Inc.

More recently several Freecycle groups became displeased with Freecycle's trademark enforcement practices and their continuing legal battles against free recycling groups not affiliated with TFN and chose to become independent and list their groups in the FreeSharing.org directory.

The website FreeSharing.org was created by Eric Burke of Anderson, South Carolina to act as a directory of independent, free recycling groups and to continue the work of sharing usable items with the community instead of throwing them in the trash.

On July 3, 2007 there were 733 groups in the directory serving over 250,000 members in the USA, Canada, UK and around the world.

As of June 2016 freesharing.org is listed by "whois" as owned by Kornsin Dhanasin of Saparnsung, Bangkok, Thailand and the URL is parked and for sale.

Similar sites
 Freegle
 The Freecycle Network
 Regiving
 Any Good To You

External links
 
 Waste Lines: As Freecycle grows, idealism and reality collide - article in Grist magazine about issues confronting FreeCycle that led to the creation of FreeSharing.org
 Freecycling Blog

Waste organizations
Recycling organizations
Freecycling